Tahuna Football Club (simply known as Tahuna FC) is an Indonesian football club based in Tahuna, Sangihe Islands Regency, North Sulawesi. They currently compete in the Liga 3.

Honours
 Liga 3 North Sulawesi
 Runner-up: 2021

References

External links

Football clubs in Indonesia
Football clubs in North Sulawesi
Association football clubs established in 2014
2014 establishments in Indonesia